John Sinclair is the name as well as the protagonist of a popular German horror detective fiction series (of the pulp fiction or penny dreadful variety). Sinclair, a Scotland Yard chief inspector, battles all kinds of undead and demonic creatures. The series appears weekly and has been running since 1973. The full title is Geisterjäger John Sinclair, (lit. Ghost Hunter John Sinclair), though the official English title is John Sinclair: Demon Hunter. While falling into the category of 'pulp fiction', the ongoing series is yet remarkable for the relatively wide range of its vocabulary and the inventiveness of its plots.

Almost all John Sinclair stories in the series have been written exclusively by Helmut Rellergerd under the nom-de-plume of Jason Dark. Only a few of the earliest stories have been written by other authors. As of late, creation of new stories is divided among Rellergerd and several new authors, each of them writing separate full episodes; the new writers are attributed for their respective stories. For example, the Oculus duology (2017) was written by Wolfgang Hohlbein, while forensic biologist Mark Benecke was the author of the novel Brandmal. Rellergerd narrates the stories in first person from Sinclair's point of view whenever he is involved. At all other times a neutral narrator style is used. In some stories Sinclair does not appear and one of his friends takes the leading part.

The  novels take place in an alternate universe within the fictional multiverse and also had numerous crossovers with John Sinclair since the 1976 story Der Fluch aus dem Dschungel.

Over the decades the Spanish painter Vicenç Badalona Ballestar has created numerous paintings and illustrations for the bestselling series. Other artists that contributed artworks and cover designs for John Sinclair include Tim White, Les Edwards, Luis Royo, Vicente Segrelles, Ron Walotsky, Alan M. Clark, Michael Whelan and Jim Warren among many others.

In Germany, the stories have also been adapted into multiple successful audiobook series, as well as a television film and a TV series. The novel series is being released in English as of April 2021 by J-Novel Club as part of their J-Novel Pulp imprint.

Characters

Heroes
John Sinclair is of Scottish descent and the reborn soul of both King Solomon and Knight Templar Hector de Valois. He is a direct descendant of Henry I Sinclair, Earl of Orkney. John Sinclair is described as 1.90m tall and blond in his middle thirties. Like most characters he does not age during the course of the series. He is called the Son of the Light and wields an extremely blessed cross as well as a Beretta handgun with silver bullets. He has acquired and lost other weapons during the series.Sinclair is a bachelor, never really having a girlfriend during the series. The one time he did fall in love, his fiance turned out to be a trap set by his enemies.
Suko is Sinclair's colleague as a Scotland Yard inspector. He is a Chinese proficient in martial arts. As an additional weapon, he carries a whip made from the skin of a demon which instantly kills all undead or demonic beings except the strongest. He has no first name, being called just Suko or Inspector Suko.Suko was brought up in a Shaolin temple somewhere in China where he learned his martial arts and discipline. Originally the driver of a powerful Chinese patron in London, he joined Sinclair after his patron and the latter's sole daughter were killed by a dragon-worshipping cult.
Sir James Powell is the direct superior of Sinclair and Suko. He rarely gets involved directly into the action, mostly giving information and valuable support and cover from his office. Sir James can arrange a lot of things due to his status in society and his connections. He has complete confidence in his team.
Glenda Perkins is the office secretary, especially famous for her coffee. During 2006 she was injected with a nano-tech serum enabling her to teleport. At first, she could not control her teleporting ability, but recently she has begun to master it quite well and is even capable of taking one or two persons with her.
Shao is Suko's longterm girlfriend. She is Japanese and the reincarnation of the Japanese Goddess Amaterasu, also known as the Phantom with the Crossbow.
Bill Conolly is a close personal friend of Sinclair's. They have studied together and been friends ever since. Bill is a freelance investigative reporter and sometimes gets involved in Sinclair's cases. He married early in the series.
Sheila Conolly, née Sheila Hopkins, is the wife of Bill Conolly. Her father was a rich industrialist killed by the demon Sakuro.
Johnny Conolly is the only child of Sheila and Bill Conolly, and John Sinclair's godson. He is the only character to age during the series, growing up into a good-looking young man currently attending the University of London. Johnny Conolly occasionally gets involved in Sinclair's cases, much to the dismay of his mother.
Jane Collins is a former witch who switched sides during the course of the series. When an agent of Asmodis cut out her heart, she had to have an artificial heart. Collins works as a successful private detective, only occasionally appearing in the series. After the death of Lady Sarah Goodwin, she inherited her Mayfair home and other possessions.
Lady Sarah Goldwyn, also called the Horror-Grandma, was a collector of horror books and films as well as antiquarian volumes on magic and the supernatural, making her an expert in the field. She took Jane Collins into her Mayfair home, bequeathing it to her when she was killed by the monster vampires of the Black Death.

Recurring villains
Most bad guys are destroyed by the end of a novel, but some arch-villains come up quite often against Sinclair until he finds a way to get rid of them permanently. Due to the horror nature of most of the creatures, some return even after being destroyed, most notably Vincent van Akkeren who started mortal and had to be killed 3 times by powers of the light before he stayed dead.
Doctor Tod ("Doctor Death") was the first recurring villain. He committed suicide after a lost battle with John Sinclair. Asmodina and the Spook transferred his soul into the body of Mafia godfather Solo Morasso. Sinclair kills him in a later battle.
Asmodina was the daughter of the devil Asmodis. Her original shape was Apep, the hell snake. However, her preferred appearance was that of a young, beautiful red headed woman with horns growing out of her forehead. During the series, she commanded Doctor Tod and his killer league. Later, Doctor Tod wanted to be independent and made a deal with the Spook to kill Asmodina. He managed to do so by taking ownership of Sinclair's silver Boomerang and beheaded her in Spook's realm.
Der Schwarze Tod ("The Black Death") is another major demon and one of John's enemies. He is based on the grim reaper and eventually defeated in the episode "Das letzte Duell".
Der Spuk ("The Spook") is an ancient demon who came into being when the universe was created. He appears in the form of a dark shadow and is the last surviving Great Old One. The "Cube of Doom" is in his possession, a magical artifact that can activate the "Todesnebel", a deadly fog that kills everyone it comes into contact with.
Will Mallmann: Formerly one of Sinclair's best friends and allies, he was a commissioner in the Bundeskriminalamt, the German Federal Criminal Police Office. During a vampire hunt, however, he was captured by vampires, fatally wounded and forced to drink a distillant from Count Dracula's blood, turning him into both a vampire and Dracula's heir (he bears the official name of "Dracula II"). Will has since plagued his former friend time and again with his scheme to turn the world into a vampire realm. A magical item, the Bloodstone, also makes him immune to any conventional means of destroying vampires. He later uses the "Vampirwelt" as his headquarters, a dimension of terror inhabited by vampires that was created by Lucifer.
Vincent van Akkeren was a director of horror movies and secretly the leader of the renegade Knights Templar that worship Baphomet. His goal was to become the grand master of all members of the order. He was later transformed into a vampire and eventually killed by the Black Death in the story "Das Versprechen des Schwarzen Tods".
Belphegor is a powerful archdemon who uses a flame whip as his signature weapon. He is eventually defeated by the Iron Angel with the magical pendulum.
Assunga is a shadow witch who wears a magical coat that allows her to teleport and jump between places and realities. For many years she was an ally of Dracula II.
Mandragoro is a plant demon who guards forests and nature.
Lupina: The Queen of Werewolfs and lover to Fenris, with whom she has a son, Luparo. Her body is that of a wolf, while her head is human looking. She is later poisoned and killed by Mandragoro when she tries to take over the plant demon's forest in Wales.
Die Horror-Reiter ("The Riders of Horror") appear in the form of four skeleton knights who are the servants of AEBA. They ride on fire-breathing horses and are loosely based on the Four Horsemen of the Apocalypse.
Saladin was an evil hypnotist and an ally of the Black Death. He later also joined forces with Dracula II.
Shimada: A demonic ninja who rivals Amaterasu and uses a sword that was forged in hell.
Fenris is an entity from norse mythology in the form of an enormous wolf. He is the ruler of werewolfs and the father of Luparo.
Strigus was the leader of the Strix and had the appearance of a giant monstrous owl. The strix that served him had skeleton heads and were the arch-enemies of vampire emperor Vampiro-del-mar and his army.
Akim Samaran was a sculptor who used wax and human skeletons to create living puppets. He held a personal grudge against the Sinclair family and was an ally of the Spook. Samaran was killed in the episode "Das Richtschwert der Templer" when he broke into a crypt and tried to steal a legendary executioner's sword that belonged to the Knights Templar.
Massago: A demon in the form of a dark silhouette who wears a leathery mask. He first appeared in the story "Das Horror-Spielzeug" and was eventually defeated with the silver cross by John Sinclair.

Weapons and special items
Sinclair's weapon of choice is his blessed Silver Cross, inscribed with the initials of the four archangels Michael, Raphael, Gabriel and Uriel. This cross is able to take out any but the most powerful of demons. Being fashioned in biblical times by the prophet Ezekiel, it was bequeathed to John Sinclair by divine powers, making him the "Son of Light".The Cross violently attacks any evil force it comes into contact with while protecting any good creature. It is a very powerful artifact whose powers are not yet completely understood by Sinclair. He can further activate the cross with the spell 'Terra pestem teneto, salus hic maneto' turning it into an even more powerful area effect weapon.
Several characters, mostly Sinclair, Suko, Bill Conolly and Jane Collins, carry a Beretta pistol armed with silver bullets. These bullets are blessed by a Catholic abbot and can vanquish most weaker undead or demonic creatures on impact. Against vampires, air-powered pistols firing wooden darts are also used.
Suko's demon-hide whip is made from the skin of a defeated demon. It is more powerful than the silver bullets but less than the silver cross. Suko is an expert at wielding the whip and can take out most creatures with one hit.

Religion
Rellergerd never states exactly which Christian denomination John Sinclair or any of his team is a member of. The silver bullets are made by a Catholic abbot, even though most of the team probably belong to a Protestant variant of Christianity. Suko and Shao are Buddhists.

Critical assessment
There has been some scholarly engagement with the Sinclair novels of Jason Dark, particularly as regards their author's powers of imagination and inventiveness, and a positive assessment has on occasion been expressed. Tony Page comments:

Live-action version
In April 1997, the live-action television film  based on the novels premiered on the channel RTL. It starred  as John Sinclair.

The novels were later also adapted into the television series Geisterjäger John Sinclair that premiered on RTL in January 2000. It consists of nine episodes that were directed by Robert Sigl, John van de Rest, Daniel Anderson and Bernd Fiedler. The series received generally negative reviews from critics, fans of the novel series and author Helmut Rellergerd himself.

Translations
In addition, the John Sinclair novel series has also been translated into various other languages, with some of the stories being published more than once in some European countries. Translated versions of the stories were published in Belgium, England, Finland, France, the Netherlands and the Czech Republic. A new English translation is available from J-Novel Club featuring never-before translated stories.

2015 English version
In 2015, Bastei Lübbe released the first issue of John Sinclair – Demon Hunter, an English reboot of the Sinclair series that retells the story from the beginning. It is only loosely based on the original stories by Helmut Rellergerd. This e-book series was written by Gabriel Conroy and ended after 12 issues.

John Sinclair – Demon Hunter was also adapted into an English audio drama series, which was recorded at OMUK Studios, London and Igloo Music, Los Angeles.

Main cast
 Anthony Skordi as Narrator
 Andrew Wincott as John Sinclair
 David Rintoul as Sir James Powell
 Carl Prekopp as Bill Connolly

12 episodes of the John Sinclair – Demon Hunter audiobook series were released between 2015 and 2019:

Curse of the Undead
 Directed by Douglas Welbat
 Original release: 27 March 2015
Additional cast

 Toby Longworth as Dr Ivan Orgoff
 Jess Robinson as Anne Baxter
 Terry Wilton as Constable Jones
 Robbie MacNabb as Paddy
 Peter Marinker as Kinny Mitchell
 Emma Tate as Dr McAlister
 Dan Mersh as Ronald Winston
 Charlotte Moore as Caroline Winston
 Nico Lennon as Captain Green
 Ben Whitehead as Jim Burns
 Daniel Kendrick as Bill Mackenzie
 Louis Suc as Billy
 Martha Mackintosh as Mother
 Nicolette McKenzie as Radio Voice

The Lord of Death
 Directed by Douglas Welbat
 Original release: 12 June 2015
Additional cast

 Peter Marinker as Dr Sawyer
 Tim Bentinck as High Priest
 Bill Roberts as Ramon Menendez
 Eric Meyers as Chester Davis
 Laurence Bouvard as Yolanda Garcia
 Toby Longworth as El Gorán
 Nicolette McKenzie as Viola Wayne
 Daniel Kendrick as Private Shelton
 Nico Lennon as Jack Bancroft

Dr. Satanos
 Directed by Douglas Welbat
 Original release: 31 July 2015
Additional cast

 Gareth Armstrong as Dr Satanos
 Tim Bentinck as Barney Browne
 Nicolette McKenzie as Marianne Browne
 Alix Wilton Regan as June Galloway
 Ben Whitehead as Harold Galloway
 Bill Roberts and Eric Meyers as Animal Rights Activists
 Charlotte Moore as Edwina Jackson
 Nico Lennon as Wilkins
 Martha Mackintosh as Waitress

A Feast of Blood
 Directed by Douglas Welbat
 Original release: 25 September 2015
Additional cast

 Ashley Margolis as Francis Carrigan
 Martha Mackintosh as Linda Elkham
 Laurence Bouvard as Lady L
 Bill Roberts as Istvan Laduga
 David Shaw Parker as Officer Sanford
 Adam Longworth as Robert Elkham
 Rachel Atkins as Abigail Cunningham
 Robbie MacNabb as Earl of Carrigan
 Gareth Armstrong as Dr Grayson
 Terry Wilton as Horace Sinclair
 Tim Bentinck as Walter
 Alix Wilton Regan as Mandy
 Charlotte Moore as Teacher
 Daniel Kendrick as Marquis

Dark Pharaoh
 Directed by Douglas Welbat
 Original release: 11 December 2015
Additional cast

 Martha Mackintosh as Sheila Hopkins
 Ben Whitehead as Kenneth Hopkins
 Terry Wilton as Sir Gerald Hopkins
 Toby Longworth as Dr Qureshi
 Nico Lennon as Wendell Carson
 Kerry Shale as Sakuro
 Carolanne Lyme as Farrah
 Nicolette McKenzie as Mrs Chopra
 Adam Longworth as Xotorez
 Glen McCready as Ellery

The Vampire Graveyard
 Directed by Douglas Welbat
 Original release: 26 February 2016
Additional cast

 Peter Marinker as Dr Sawyer
 Dan Mersh as Winnie
 Alix Wilton Regan as Emily
 Daniel Kendrick as Billygoat
 Kerry Shale as Jeremiah Worthington
 Glen McCready as Dr Adam Boscombe
 Rachel Atkins as Dr Charlotte Manning
 Ben Whitehead as Dr Patel
 Nico Lennon as Constable Jim Clarke
 Nicolette McKenzie as Simona Grace
 Carolanne Lyme as Mrs Bliss
 Bill Roberts as Wilbur Abernathy
 Charlotte Moore as Mrs Sinclair
 Terry Wilton as Horace Sinclair
 Emma Tate as Mary
 Toby Longworth as Whalen
 Tim Bentinck as Fred
 Adam Longworth as Harold Godfrey

A Long Day in Hell
 Directed by Douglas Welbat
 Original release: 10 November 2017
Additional cast

 Jess Robinson as Glenda Perkins
 Neil Dudgeon as Dr Ralph Barlow
 Clare Louise Connolly as Laura Cody
 Max Furst as Jimmy Cody
 Steve Furst as Viktor Benedict
 Suzanne Cave as Olivia Benedict
 Nicolette McKenzie as Agnes
 Alexandra Dowling as Elizabeth Bathory
 Neil McCaul as Father Graham
 Colleen Prendergast as Maggie
 Matt Littler as Joe Hastings
 Ashley Margolis as Ed Wilbur
 Harriet Kershaw as EMT
 Rob Rackstraw as Policeman
 Liane-Rose Bunce and Milenna Rose Binks as Nurses
 Dan Mersh, Eric Meyers and Glen McCready as Guards
 Harriet Carmichael, Alec Guelff and Alix Wilton Regan as Women

The Taste of Human Flesh
 Directed by Douglas Welbat
 Original release: 2 May 2019

To Kill A Beast
 Directed by Douglas Welbat
 Original release: 2 May 2019

Black Dragon Rising
 Directed by Douglas Welbat
 Original release: 2 May 2019

Rage of the Black Dragon
 Directed by Douglas Welbat
 Original release: 2 May 2019

Some Darker Magic
 Directed by Douglas Welbat
 Original release: 2 May 2019

2021 English Version 
In April 2021, light novel and manga publisher J-Novel Club announced John Sinclair: Demon Hunter as one of three launch titles for its J-Novel Pulp imprint, dedicated to the best of European pulp fiction. Nine volumes, each containing four installments, or "episodes", have been announced. The cover art for this release is by NAMCOOo, artist for the light novel series Outer Ragna.

Volumes 1-3 of J-Novel Club's release feature a reworked version of the 2015 Gabriel Conroy stories. Changes include realigning the stories to their original 1970's time period and reverting alterations to some characters in order to more smoothly transition into Jason Dark's original stories, starting with Volume 4. The J-Novel Club release also sees Conroy's text adapted into British English as the novels were originally written with American spelling and phraseology.

Beginning with Volume 4, the J-Novel Pulp release contains direct, unaltered translations from a selection of Jason Dark's original stories as chosen by the Geisterjäger John Sinclair editors.

In line with J-Novel Club's light novel releases, new installments are first serialized on J-Novel Club's website over a number of weeks for subscribers. The first part of each volume is free for all visitors and requires no membership or subscription to read. Following web serialization, each volume is released as an Ebook at all major digital book retailers. J-Novel Club members who purchase the books directly receive textless versions of the cover art as a bonus.

List of J-Novel Club Volumes

References

External links
 How It All Began: John Sinclair's First Case (short novel by Jason Dark)

Literary characters introduced in 1973